The Borough of Hartlepool is a unitary authority area in ceremonial County Durham, England. The borough's largest town is Hartlepool.

It borders the County Durham district as well as the boroughs of Redcar and Cleveland and Stockton-on-Tees. The local authority is Hartlepool Borough Council, a member of the Tees Valley Combined Authority.

In 2003 it had a resident population of 90,161, increasing to 92,028 at the 2011 Census. It is made up of 17 council wards and the Hartlepool constituency has been coterminous with the council area since the 1983 parliamentary redistribution.

History

After several unification efforts starting in 1902, the county borough of Hartlepool was formed in 1967 by the merger of the original borough of Hartlepool (the "Headland") with the county borough of West Hartlepool further south on Tees Bay, together with the parish of Seaton Carew to provide coastal land for industrial development.

The borough was reformed and enlarged on 1 April 1974, by the merger of the previous county borough of Hartlepool, along with the parishes of Brierton, Claxton, Dalton Piercy, Elwick, Elwick Hall, Greatham, Hart and Newton Bewley, from the Stockton Rural District, all of which had been part of the administrative county of Durham. The enlarged borough was transferred at the same time from County Durham to the new non-metropolitan county of Cleveland.

Cleveland was abolished in 1996 after a review by the Banham Commission, with the four boroughs of Stockton-on-Tees, Hartlepool, Redcar & Cleveland and Middlesbrough becoming unitary authorities. For ceremonial purposes Hartlepool returned to County Durham, however it continues to share certain local services with the other former Cleveland boroughs, including the Cleveland Police and Cleveland Fire Brigade.

In May 2021, four parish councils of the villages of Elwick, Hart, Dalton Piercy and Greatham all issued individual votes of no confidence in Hartlepool Borough Council, and expressed their desire to re-join County Durham.

Council

Since 2 May 2013 the council has used the leader and committee hybrid model of executive arrangements. The executive function of Hartlepool Borough Council was controlled by a directly elected mayor of Hartlepool from 2002 to 2013. On 9 May 2019, The former Labour Council leader Christopher Akers-Belcher and two fellow party members, defected to the Socialist Labour Party following the Labour Party's defeat in the recent local elections. On 13 September 2019, ten independent councillors defected to the Brexit Party. The Conservative councillors then formed a pact with the Brexit Party councillors to become the largest group on the council.

In March 2021, four parish councils of the villages of Elwick, Hart, Dalton Piercy and Greatham all issued individual votes of no confidence in Hartlepool Borough Council due to a planning application being passed that they disagreed with, and hoped to use the issue to influence the outcome of the Local Elections.

Elected mayor

Between 2002 and 2013, Hartlepool was one of a small number of councils in the United Kingdom to have a directly elected mayor. This followed a referendum held in the borough in October 2001, and the first mayoral election was held in May 2002. The election became famous for being won by the mascot of Hartlepool United F.C., 'H'Angus the Monkey', with a majority of approximately 500 over the second-placed Labour Party candidate. The man inside the monkey costume, Stuart Drummond, served as mayor as an independent, being re-elected in 2005 with a majority of over 10,000 and again in 2009 with a second round majority of 844.

In November 2012 Hartlepool voted in a referendum to abolish the directly elected mayor and return to having the council leader model used by most English councils. 7,366 voted against the directly elected mayor system, while 5,177 voted to retain it, on a turnout of 18%.

Settlements
Settlements in the borough include:

Demography

Ethnicity

Economy
This is a chart of trend of regional gross value added of Hartlepool and Stockton-on-Tees at current basic prices published (pp. 240–253) by Office for National Statistics with figures in millions of British Pounds Sterling.

Notes

References

External links 
 Hartlepool Borough Council

 
1974 establishments in England
Local government in County Durham
Unitary authority districts of England
Places in the Tees Valley
Local government districts of North East England
Boroughs in England